Benjamin Ashley Van Ryn (born August 9, 1971) is a former Major League Baseball pitcher who played for two seasons. He played for the California Angels in 1996 and the Chicago Cubs, San Diego Padres, and Toronto Blue Jays in 1998.

External links

Ben Van Ryn at Pura Pelota (Venezuelan Professional Baseball League)

1971 births
Living people
Albuquerque Dukes players
American expatriate baseball players in Canada
Baseball players from Fort Wayne, Indiana
California Angels players
Caribes de Oriente players
Charlotte Knights players
Chattanooga Lookouts players
Chicago Cubs players
Gulf Coast Expos players
Iowa Cubs players
Jamestown Expos players
Louisville Redbirds players
Major League Baseball pitchers
Midland Angels players
San Antonio Missions players
San Diego Padres players
Sumter Flyers players
Syracuse SkyChiefs players
Tiburones de La Guaira players
American expatriate baseball players in Venezuela
Tigres de Aragua players
Toronto Blue Jays players
Vancouver Canadians players
Vero Beach Dodgers players